Group A of the 2000 Rugby League World Cup is one of the four groups in the 2000 Rugby League World Cup.

Standings

Matches

England vs Australia 
This was the first rugby league match to be played at Twickenham Stadium, London's home of rugby union.

Fiji vs Russia 

Fiji:1. Lote Tuqiri, 2. Jone Kuraduadua, 3. Waisale Sovatabua, 4. Eparama Navale, 5. Farasiko Tokarei, 6. Semi Tadulala, 7. Stephen Smith8. Kalaveti Tuiabayaba, 9. Tabua Cakacaka, 10. Freddie Robarts, 11. Etuate Vakatawa, 12. Joe Tamani, 13. Samuela Marayawa.Substitutes: 14. Atunasia Vunivialu, 15. Josefa Lasagavibau, 16. Amani Takayawa, 17. Peceli Vuniyayawa.

Russia:1. Robert Ilyasov, 2. Mikhail Mitrofanov, 3. Matt Donovan, 4. Craig Cygler, 5. Maxim Romanov, 6. Andrei Olari, 7. Igor Gavrilin8. Ian Rubin, 8. Alexandr Lysenkov, 10. Robert Campbell, 11. Petr Sokolov, 12. Aaron Findlay, 13. Joel Rullis.Substitutes: Pavel Kalashkin, Viktor Nechaev, Igor Zhiltsov, Vadim Postnikov.

Australia vs Fiji 
Australians Ben Kennedy, Trent Barrett and Nathan Hindmarsh were selected to make their Kangaroo debuts in this match.

Australia:1. Darren Lockyer, 2. Mat Rogers, 3. Ryan Girdler, 4. Matt Gidley, 5. Adam MacDougall, 6. Trent Barrett, 7. Andrew Johns, 8. Jason Stevens, 9. Craig Gower, 10. Michael Vella, 11. Ben Kennedy, 12. Nathan Hindmarsh, 13. Brad Fittler.Substitutes: Scott Hill, Jason Croker, Robbie Kearns, Shane Webcke.Coach: Chris Anderson

Tries: Rogers 4, Kennedy 2, Barrett, Hindmarsh, MacDougall, Girdler 2, Gidley.Goals: Rogers 9.

Fiji:1. Lote Tuqiri, 2. Jone Kuraduadua, 3. Waisale Sovatabua, 4. Eparama Navale, 5. Semi Tadulala, 6. Stephen Smith, 7. Kaleveti Naisoro, 8. Tabua Cakacaka, 9. Fred Robarts, 10. Etuate Vakatawa, 11. Joe Tamani, 12. Samuela Marayawa, 13. Atunasia Vunivialu.Substitutes: Farasiko Tokarei, Mesake Navugona, Amani Takayawa, Peceli Wawavanua.

England vs Russia

England vs Fiji

Australia vs Russia

References

External links 
 Rugby League Project

2000 Rugby League World Cup